Batavia is a city in Jefferson County, Iowa, United States. The population was 430 at the 2020 census. It was established in 1846.

Geography
Batavia is located at  (40.997604, -92.167752).

Demographics

2010 census
As of the census of 2010, there were 499 people, 216 households, and 137 families living in the city. The racial makeup of the city was 99.2% White, 0.2% Native American, 0.2% from other races, and 0.4% from two or more races. Hispanic or Latino of any race were 3.6% of the population.

There were 216 households, of which 30.6% had children under the age of 18 living with them, 47.7% were married couples living together, 10.6% had a female householder with no husband present, 5.1% had a male householder with no wife present, and 36.6% were non-families. 32.9% of all households were made up of individuals, and 11.5% had someone living alone who was 65 years of age or older. The average household size was 2.31 and the average family size was 2.85.

The median age in the city was 40.4 years. 23.8% of residents were under the age of 18; 8.2% were between the ages of 18 and 24; 24.2% were from 25 to 44; 28.6% were from 45 to 64; and 15% were 65 years of age or older. The gender makeup of the city was 45.9% male and 54.1% female.

2000 census
As of the census of 2000, there were 500 people, 219 households, and 139 families living in the city. The racial makeup of the city was 98.60% White, 0.40% Native American, 0.21% Asian, 0.20% from other races, and 0.60% from two or more races. Hispanic or Latino of any race were 1.80% of the population.

There were 219 households, out of which 29.2% had children under the age of 18 living with them, 56.6% were married couples living together, 5.0% had a female householder with no husband present, and 36.1% were non-families. 31.5% of all households were made up of individuals, and 14.2% had someone living alone who was 65 years of age or older. The average household size was 2.28 and the average family size was 2.88.

In the city, the population was spread out, with 23.2% under the age of 18, 6.0% from 18 to 24, 30.6% from 25 to 44, 24.2% from 45 to 64, and 16.0% who were 65 years of age or older. The median age was 41 years. For every 100 females, there were 96.1 males. For every 100 females age 18 and over, there were 89.2 males.

The median income for a household in the city was $33,333, and the median income for a family was $39,063. Males had a median income of $28,125 versus $21,319 for females. The per capita income for the city was $18,970. None of the families and 3.5% of the population were living below the poverty line, including no under eighteens and 12.0% of those over 64.

Notable person
David Miller, lawyer, farmer, businessman, and politician, was born in Batavia.

References

Cities in Iowa
Cities in Jefferson County, Iowa
1846 establishments in Iowa Territory